The economy of Mayotte is based primarily on the agricultural sector, including fishing and livestock raising. The island of Mayotte is not self-sufficient and must import a large portion of its food requirements, mainly from Metropolitan France. The economy and future development of the island are heavily dependent on French financial assistance, an important supplement to GDP. Mayotte's remote location is an obstacle to the development of tourism.

References

See also 

 Economy of France in: French Guiana, French Polynesia, Guadeloupe, Martinique, Mayotte, New Caledonia, Réunion, Saint Barthélemy, Saint Martin, Saint Pierre and Miquelon, Wallis and Futuna
 Taxation in France
 Economic history of France
 Poverty in France